Ay was the penultimate pharaoh of ancient Egypt's 18th Dynasty. He held the throne of Egypt for a brief four-year period in the late 14th century BC. Prior to his rule, he was a close advisor to two, and perhaps three, other pharaohs of the dynasty. It is speculated that he was the power behind the throne during child ruler Tutankhamun's reign. His prenomen Kheperkheperure means "Everlasting are the Manifestations of Ra," while his nomen Ay it-netjer reads as "Ay, Father of the God." Records and monuments that can be clearly attributed to Ay are rare, both because his reign was short and because his successor, Horemheb, instigated a campaign of damnatio memoriae against him and the other pharaohs associated with the unpopular Amarna Period.

Origins and family

Ay is believed to have been from Akhmim. During his short reign, he built a rock-cut chapel in Akhmim and dedicated it to the local deity Min. He may have been the son of the courtier Yuya and his wife Thuya, making him a brother of Tiye and Anen. This connection is based on the fact that both Yuya and Ay came from Akhmim and held the titles 'God's Father' and 'Master of Horses'. A strong physical resemblance has been noted between the mummy of Yuya and surviving statuary depictions of Ay. The mummy of Ay has not been located, although fragmentary skeletal remains recovered from his tomb may represent it, so a more thorough comparison with Yuya cannot be made. Therefore, the theory that he was the son of Yuya rests entirely on circumstantial evidence.

Ay's Great Royal Wife was Tey, who was known to be the wet-nurse to Nefertiti. It is often theorised that he was the father of Nefertiti as a way to explain his title 'God's Father' as it has been argued that the term designates a man whose daughter married the king. However, nowhere are Ay and Tey referred to as the parents of Nefertiti.

Nakhtmin, Ay's chosen successor, was likely his son or grandson. His mother's name was Iuy, a priestess of Min and Isis in Akhmim. She may have been Ay's first wife.

Amarna Period

All that is known for certain was that by the time he was permitted to build a tomb for himself (Southern Tomb 25) at Amarna during the reign of Akhenaten, he had achieved the title of "Overseer of All the Horses of His Majesty", the highest rank in the elite charioteering division of the army, which was just below the rank of General. Prior to this promotion he appears to have been first a Troop Commander and then a "regular" Overseer of Horses, titles which were found on a box thought to have been part of the original furnishings for his tomb. Other titles listed in this tomb include Fan-bearer on the Right Side of the King, Acting Scribe of the King, beloved by him, and God's Father. The 'Fan-bearer on the Right Side of the King' was a very important position, and is viewed as showing that the bearer had the 'ear' of the ruler. The final God's Father title is the one most associated with Ay, and was later incorporated into his royal name when he became pharaoh.

This title could mean that he was the father-in-law of the pharaoh, suggesting that he was the son of Yuya and Thuya, thus being a brother or half-brother of Tiye, brother-in-law to Amenhotep III and the maternal uncle of Akhenaten. Instead, the title may indicate that Ay was the tutor of Tutankhamun. If Ay was the son of Yuya, who was a senior military officer during the reign of Amenhotep III, then he likely followed in his father's footsteps, finally inheriting his father's military functions upon his death. Alternatively, it could also mean that he may have had a daughter that married the pharaoh Akhenaten, possibly being the father of Akhenaten's chief wife Nefertiti. Ultimately there is no evidence to definitively prove either hypothesis. The two theories are not mutually exclusive, but either relationship would explain the exalted status to which Ay rose during Akhenaten's Amarna interlude, when the royal family turned their backs on Egypt's traditional gods and experimented, for a dozen years or so, with an early form of monotheism; an experiment that, whether out of conviction or convenience, Ay appears to have followed under the reign of Akhenaten.

The Great Hymn to the Aten is also found in his Amarna tomb which was built during his service under Akhenaten. His wife Tey was born a commoner but was given the title Nurse of the Pharaoh's Great Wife. If she were the mother of Nefertiti she would be expected to have the royal title Mother of the Pharaoh's Great Wife instead; had Ay been the father of Nefertiti, then Tey would have been her stepmother. In several Amarna tomb chapels there is a woman whose name begins with "Mut" who had the title Sister of the Pharaoh's Great Wife. This could also be a daughter of Ay's by his wife Tey, and it is known that his successor Horemheb married a woman with the name Mutnodjimet.

Tutankhamun

Ay's reign was preceded by that of Tutankhamun, who ascended to the throne at the age of eight or nine, at a time of great tension between the new monotheism and the old polytheism. He was assisted in his kingly duties by his predecessor's two closest advisors: Grand Vizier Ay and General of the Armies Horemheb. Tutankhamun's nine-year reign, largely under Ay's direction, saw the return of the old gods – and, with that, the restoration of the power of the Amun priesthood, who had lost their influence over Egypt under Akhenaten.

Egyptologist Bob Brier suggested that Ay murdered Tutankhamun in order to usurp the throne, a claim which was based on X-ray examinations of the body done in 1968. He also alleged that Ankhesenamun and the Hittite prince she was about to marry were also murdered at his orders. This murder theory was not accepted by all scholars, and further analysis of the x-rays, along with CT scans taken in 2005, found no evidence to suggest that Tutankhamun died from a blow to the head as Brier had theorized.
In 2010, a team led by Zahi Hawass reported that the young king had died from a combination of a broken leg, malaria and Köhler disease but another team from the Bernhard Nocht Institute for Tropical Medicine in Hamburg believes his death was caused by sickle cell disease.

Ay buried his young predecessor, as depicted on the wall of Tutankhamun's burial chamber. The explicit depiction of a succeeding king conducting the "Opening of the Mouth" ceremony of another is unique; the depictions are usually more generic.

Ay was buried in the tomb intended for Tutankhamun in the West Valley of the Kings (WV23), and Tutankhamun was interred in Ay's intended tomb in the East Valley of the Kings (KV62).

Rule as pharaoh

Depending on the chronology followed, Ay served as pharaoh between 1323–1319 BC, 1327–1323 BC, or 1310–1306 BC. Tutankhamun's death around the age of 18 or 19, together with the fact he had no living children, left a power vacuum that his Grand Vizier Ay was quick to fill: he is depicted conducting the funerary rites for the deceased monarch and assuming the role of heir. The grounds on which he based his successful claim to power are not entirely clear. The Commander of the Army, Horemheb, had actually been designated as the "idnw" or "Deputy of the Lord of the Two Lands" under Tutankhamun and was presumed to be the boy king's heir apparent and successor. It appears that Horemheb was outmaneuvered to the throne by Ay, who legitimized his claim to the throne by burying Tutankhamun, as well as possibly marrying Ankhesenamun, Tutankhamun's widow.

Since Ay was already advanced in age upon his accession, he ruled Egypt in his own right for only four years. During this period, he consolidated the return to the old religious ways that he had initiated as senior advisor and constructed a mortuary temple at Medinet Habu for his own use. A stela of Nakhtmin (Berlin 2074), a military officer under Tutankhamun who was Ay's chosen successor—is dated to "Year 4, IV Akhet day 1" of Ay's reign. Manetho's Epitome assigns a reign length of four years and one month to Horemheb, and this was usually assigned to him based on this Year 4 dated stela; however, it is now believed that figure should be raised by a decade to fourteen years and one month and attributed to Horemheb instead, as Manetho intended. Hence, Ay's precise reign length is unknown and he could have ruled for as long as seven to nine years, since most of his monuments and his funerary temple at Medinet Habu were either destroyed or usurped by his successor, Horemheb.

Royal succession

Prior to his death, Ay designated Nakhtmin to succeed him as pharaoh. However, his succession plan went awry, as Horemheb became the last king of Egypt's 18th Dynasty instead of Nakhtmin. The fact that Nakhtmin was Ay's intended heir is strongly implied by an inscription carved on a dyad funerary statue of Nakhtmin and his spouse which was presumably made during Ay's reign. Nakhtmin is clearly given the titles "Crown Prince" (jrj-pꜥt) and "King's Son" (zꜣ-nswt). The only conclusion which can be drawn here is that Nakhtmin was either a son or an adopted son of Ay's, and that Ay was grooming Nakhtmin for the royal succession instead of Horemheb. Egyptologists Aidan Dodson and Dyan Hilton observe that the aforementioned statue:

Aftermath

It appears that one of Horemheb's undertakings as Pharaoh was to eliminate all references to the monotheistic experiment, a process that included expunging the name of his immediate predecessors, especially Ay, from the historical record. Horemheb desecrated Ay's burial and had most of Ay's royal cartouches in his WV23 tomb erased while his sarcophagus was smashed into numerous fragments. However, the intact sarcophagus lid was discovered in 1972 by Otto Schaden. The lid had been buried under debris in this king's tomb and still preserved Ay's cartouche. Horemheb also usurped Ay's mortuary temple at Medinet Habu for his own use. Uvo Hölscher (1878–1963) who excavated the temple in the early 1930s provides these interesting details concerning the state of Ay-Horemheb's mortuary temple:

In fiction
Ay appears as a villain in the 17th book in Lucien de Gieter's Papyrus comic book series (Tutankhamun, The Assassinated Pharaoh).  
Ay appears as a major character in Paul C. Doherty's trilogy of Ancient Egyptian novels, An Evil Spirit Out of the West, The Season of the Hyaena and The Year of the Cobra. 
Kerry Greenwood's novel, Out of the Black Land, features him as a greedy villain whose sole goal was accruing wealth.
He is a character in Wolfgang Hohlbein's Die Prophezeihung (The Prophecy). 
He is also a major character in Michelle Moran's bestselling novel Nefertiti.  
Ay is the villain of Lucile Morrison's young adult novel The Lost Queen of Egypt (1937). 
He is also a character in Mika Waltari's historical novel The Egyptian, again depicted as immoral and villainous. 
Ay serves as a central character in Tut, portrayed by Ben Kingsley.
Ay is a minor character in the time travel to the 18th dynasty in Mr. Peabody & Sherman
Ay is a central character in Gwendolyn MacEwen's novel King of Egypt, King of Dreams, where he is portrayed as one of Akhenaten's closest confidants, spiritual antagonists, and supporters. The novel also presents Ay as Tiye's brother and one time lover, and it is suggested that he, rather than Amenhotep III, may be Akhenaten's father. Much of the novel is told from Ay's perspective as he reluctantly attempts to navigate the changes of the Amarna period, and the second to last chapter is his memoir/confession near the end of his pharaonic reign, in which Ay admits to killing the ailing and blind Akhenaten at the dying pharaoh's request.

References

Further reading
 Jürgen von Beckerath, Chronologie des Pharaonischen Ägypten, MÄS 46 (Philip von Zabern, Mainz: 1997), pp. 201

 
1320s BC deaths
14th-century BC Pharaohs
People from Sohag Governorate
Pharaohs of the Eighteenth Dynasty of Egypt
Historical negationism in ancient Egypt
Viziers of the Eighteenth Dynasty of Egypt
Year of birth unknown
Fan-bearer on the Right Side of the King